Hernán Ignacio Hechalar (born 12 August 1988) is an Argentine professional footballer who plays as a forward for Juventud Antoniana.

Career
Belgrano were Hechalar's first senior team, he made three appearances for the first-team after time in the youth system. His debut Belgrano appearance was on 7 August 2008 versus Unión Santa Fe, his second came over a month later against future club Atlético Tucumán. In 2009, Hechalar was loaned out twice, firstly to Juventud Antoniana of Torneo Argentino A and then to Guaraní of the Paraguayan Primera División. A year later, in July 2010, Hechalar rejoined Juventud Antoniana on a permanent contract. Over his two spells with the club, Hechalar scored twelve goals in seventy-four matches in the third tier.

On 8 July 2012, Hechalar joined fellow Torneo Argentino A team Unión Mar del Plata. He scored on his Unión debut, netting a late consolation goal in a 2–1 defeat to Alvarado. Seven more goals and twenty-three more games followed in his first season. Hechalar departed Argentine football in 2014 to sign for Categoría Primera A side Atlético Huila in Colombia. He went onto score thirteen goals in thirty-eight matches. After just one season with Atlético Huila, Hechalar left and joined Independiente Medellín twelve months after arriving; one hundred and thirty-two appearances and twenty-nine goals followed.

On 23 August 2017, Hechalar joined Argentine Primera División side Atlético Tucumán on loan. One year following, Delfín of the Ecuadorian Serie A loaned Hechalar. Having netted once in thirteen encounters across the 2018 campaign, Hechalar resigned with Atlético Huila in January 2019; signing a loan deal.

Career statistics
.

Honours
Independiente Medellín
Categoría Primera A: 2016 Apertura

References

External links

1988 births
Living people
Footballers from Córdoba, Argentina
Argentine footballers
Argentine expatriate footballers
Argentine expatriate sportspeople in Paraguay
Argentine expatriate sportspeople in Colombia
Argentine expatriate sportspeople in Ecuador
Argentine expatriate sportspeople in Chile
Expatriate footballers in Paraguay
Expatriate footballers in Colombia
Expatriate footballers in Ecuador
Expatriate footballers in Chile
Association football forwards
Primera Nacional players
Torneo Argentino A players
Categoría Primera A players
Argentine Primera División players
Ecuadorian Serie A players
Primera B de Chile players
Club Atlético Belgrano footballers
Juventud Antoniana footballers
Club Guaraní players
Unión de Mar del Plata footballers
Atlético Huila footballers
Independiente Medellín footballers
Atlético Tucumán footballers
Delfín S.C. footballers
Gimnasia y Esgrima de Jujuy footballers
Cobreloa footballers